Juan Carlos Sánchez Martínez (born 27 July 1987), known as Juan Carlos, is a Spanish professional footballer who plays as a goalkeeper.

Club career
Born in Calvià, Balearic Islands, Juan Carlos was a product of Villarreal CF's youth academy. He made his debut for the first team on 13 April 2008 in a 1–0 loss away loss against UD Almería, subbing in for sent off Diego López in the 18th minute. Previously, he was the undisputed starter for the reserves for three full seasons, starting in all the games he appeared in, including in 2008–09 as they promoted to Segunda División for the first time ever.

Juan Carlos was third choice behind López and Sebastián Viera during the 2007–08 and 2008–09 campaigns in La Liga. In 2010–11 he was promoted to backup, but still did not manage to play any league matches.

On 12 July 2011, Juan Carlos was loaned to Valencian Community neighbours Elche CF in the second tier. He severed his ties with Villarreal on 9 July 2015, and joined Albacete Balompié on a two-year contract the following day.

On 8 July 2016, after Alba's relegation, Juan Carlos signed a two-year deal with Real Oviedo also in division two. Midway through the 2017–18 season he lost his starting spot to Alfonso Herrero, and left the club as his contract expired.

Juan Carlos agreed to a two-year contract at CD Numancia on 23 July 2018, still in the second division. On 30 July 2020, he moved to CD Atlético Baleares of Segunda División B as a free agent.

References

External links

1987 births
Living people
Spanish footballers
Footballers from Mallorca
Association football goalkeepers
La Liga players
Segunda División players
Segunda División B players
Tercera División players
Tercera Federación players
Villarreal CF B players
Villarreal CF players
Elche CF players
Albacete Balompié players
Real Oviedo players
CD Numancia players
CD Atlético Baleares footballers
UD Poblense players